JS Yūbari (DE-227) was a  of the Japanese Maritime Self-Defense Force.

Development and design 

However, the 52DE was too small and lacked room, and the lack of ability to act in stormy weather due to the ship's shape was also a problem. The original plan was to build more ships of the same type as a replacement for the retired submarine chaser, but before the commissioning of the ship, the ships built in 1979 were homomorphic ships with a slightly expanded ship type.

From the above background, the basic design is an advanced version of 52DE. The basic plan number is E111. Along with this, the floor area of the battle area including CIC and the living area has increased, and the warehouse has been expanded to improve the living and living environment. The fuel tank was also enlarged and the fuel load increased by about 35 percent, which led to an extension of the cruising range. The engine had the same configuration as the 52DE, and was a CODOG system with Mitsubishi Heavy Industries 6DRV35 / 44 diesel engine and Kawasaki-Rolls-Royce Olympus TM3B gas turbine engine.

Construction and career 
She was laid down on 9 February 1981 and launched on 22 February 1982 at Sumitomo Heavy Industries Shipyard in Uraga. She commissioned on 18 March 1983.

On 24 March 1997, the 35th escort corps was renamed to the 27th escort corps due to the revision of the corps number.

The vessel was engaged in disaster relief due to the eruption of Mount Usu that occurred on 31 March 2000.

On 3 April 2006, the 27th Escort Corps was abolished and transferred to the 25th Escort Corps of the Ominato District Force. On 26 March 2008, the 25th escort corps was renamed to the 15th escort corps due to a major reorganization of the Self-Defense Fleet, and was reorganized under the escort fleet. She was decommissioned on 25 June 2010 and sent to scrap a few years later.

Gallery

References

1982 ships
Ships built by Sumitomo Heavy Industries
Yubari-class destroyer escorts